Calabouço may refer to:

 Calabouço River, river in eastern Brazil
 Calabouço, Mozambique